The United States Army Staff Identification Badge is a badge of the United States Army worn by personnel who serve at the Office of the Secretary of the Army and the Army Staff at Headquarters, Department of the Army (HQDA) and its agencies.  Neither an award nor a decoration, the badge is a distinguishing emblem of service.  Initially issued as a temporary badge, officers and enlisted personnel demonstrating outstanding performance of duty and meeting all eligibility requirements can be processed after one complete year (365 days cumulative) of assignment and receive a certificate authorizing permanent wear of the badge.

General Douglas MacArthur first proposed an Army General Staff Badge in 1931, but it was not until 1933 that the United States War Department authorized it.  The badge has remained unchanged in appearance since it was first created, but the name was changed in 1982 from the Army General Staff Identification Badge to the Army Staff Identification Badge, and the eligibility criteria have evolved.

On a United States Army uniform, the Army Staff Identification Badge is worn centered on the right breast pocket; however, per ALARACT 203/2010 wear of the Army Staff Identification Badge is authorized on the left breast pocket when worn in conjunction with a deployment CSIB (Combat Service Identification Badge) 

A similar Army Staff Lapel Pin is authorized for civilian employees of the Department of the Army, regardless of grade, who fill an eligible position in an HQDA agency for no less than one year.

See also
 Military badges of the United States

References

United States military badges